Pyarelal Kanwar (27 June 1933 – 14 January 2011) was a senior Congress Leader and former Deputy Chief Minister of Madhya Pradesh. He was a member of Indian National Congress and a six term MLA from Rampur Constituency of Bilaspur District (now in Korba District) of Chhattisgarh.

References 

1933 births
Indian National Congress politicians from Madhya Pradesh
Madhya Pradesh MLAs 1980–1985
Madhya Pradesh MLAs 1993–1998
Indian Hindus
Chief ministers from Indian National Congress
2011 deaths